Prousos is a village and a former municipality in Evrytania, Greece. Since the 2011 local government reform it is part of the municipality Karpenisi, of which it is a municipal unit. The municipal unit has an area of 146.680 km2. Population 1,430 (2011).

References

Populated places in Evrytania